Trophosphaera is a genus of parasites of the phylum Apicomplexa.

Only one species (Trophosphaera planorbulinae) is known for this genus.

History

This genus was described in 1939 by Le Calvez.

Description

Host records

Elphidium crispum

References

Apicomplexa genera